Lungi may refer to:
Lungi, also known as a sarong, is a traditional Asian garment. 
Longyi
Lungi, Sierra Leone, a town 
Lungi International Airport in Lungi, Sierra Leone
"Lungi Dance", a 2013 song by the Indian rapper Yo Yo Honey Singh 
Lungi Lol confrontation between British forces and the Revolutionary United Front in Sierra Leone on 17 May 2000
Lungi Ngidi (born 1996), South African cricketer 
Râul Feței Lungi, a tributary of the Săritoarea River in Romania